Diane Tell (born December 24, 1959) is a Canadian musician who was born in Quebec City, Quebec. She entered the Val d’Or conservatory at the age of six. She continued her studies at the Montréal conservatory and then at CEGEP Saint-Laurent and she wrote her first songs at the age of twelve. As one of Québec's pioneering female singer-songwriters, she proposed her personal repertoire over the course of her first four albums. She won six Félix prizes before the age of 25: breakout artist, best artist, best album, best song and, twice, songwriter of the year. Several of her songs have become SOCAN Classics and Si j’étais un homme was inducted in the Canadian Songwriters Hall of Fame in 2017. She earned a MIDEM Award for her album Chimères and a Victoire Award for her album Faire à nouveau connaissance. In 1990, she was chosen by Plamondon, Berger and Savary to play a leading role in the musical La légende de Jimmy. Following that, she played the lead and composed the score for another musical, Marilyn Montreuil, written and stage directed by Jérôme Savary and the Théâtre National du Chaillot, in Paris. Over 300 performances of both shows were presented in France and Europe. Over the past 25 years, Tell has toured relentlessly, written, composed and recorded in Canada, France, the U.K. and Switzerland. In 2018, she produced her 15th studio album of original material in Montréal. As an independent artist, she owns the phonographic rights of her entire catalogue, manages her own publishing company, and produces and finances her albums herself. Also a photographer, she directs the majority of her music videos. Her YouTube channel gets 400,000 views per month on average. In her blog, Diane Cause Musique, she engages up-and-coming artists by explaining the inner workings of the music industry.

In May 2018, Tell was elected onto SOCAN's Board of Directors for a 3-year mandate. (The Society of Composers, Authors and Music Publishers of Canada) Re-elected in 2021 for a second mandate.

Paris, July 15, 2022. Madame Rima Abdul Malak, Minister of Culture, awarded Diane Tell, as part of the spring 2022 class, the rank of Chevalier de l'ordre des Arts et des Lettres, one of the main distinctions among the four ministerial orders of the French Republic.

Discography
 1977: Diane Tell
 1979: Entre nous
 1980: En flèche
 1982: Chimères
 1984: On a besoin d'amour
 1986: Faire à nouveau connaissance
 1988: Dégriffe-moi
 1990: La légende de Jimmy
 1991: Marilyn Montreuil
 1993: Morceaux choisis
 1996: Désir Plaisir Soupir
 2003: Tout de Diane (compilation)
 2005: Popeline
 2009: Diane Tell Original Album Classics (5-CD set)
 2009: Docteur Boris & Mister Vian
 2011: Rideaux Ouverts
 2013: Une
 2013: Passe Simple (Best of)
 2014: Ne me quitte pas : Un hommage à Jacques Brel (multi-artistes québécois)
 2015: Intemporelle Diane Dufresne (multi-artistes québécois)
 2015: Duos Félix Leclerc (multi-artistes québécois)
 2019: Haïku

Awards
 Félix best singer-songwriter (1980) Quebec
 Félix best new artist (1980)
 Félix best song for "Si j'étais un homme" (1981)
 Félix best album En Flèche (1981)
 Félix best singer-songwriter (1981)
 Félix best female artist (1981)
 Juno Awards, nomination, most promising female vocalist (1984) Canada
 Midem Awards best female artist (1982) France
 Victoire de la musique best francophone album Faire à nouveau connaissance (1986) France
 Classics SOCAN - Gilberto, Si j'étais un homme, Miami, Savoir, Faire à nouveau connaissance... +
 SPACQ - PRIX ROBERT CHARLEBOIS – Rayonnement international (2015)
 "Si j'étais un homme" Inducted Canadian Songwriters Hall of fame (2017)

Live performances (selection)
 1977 Bigins at l'Évêché Montreal
 1980 La Place des Arts Montreal
 1982 Le Théâtre Saint-Denis Montreal
 1983 L'Olympia Paris
 1986 L'Olympia Paris
 1989 L'Olympia Paris
 1996 Le Spectrum Montreal
 2003 Le Palais Royal Paris
 2003 Les FrancoFolies de Montréal Club Soda Montreal
 2003 Le Théâtre du Petit Champlain, Quebec
 2005 Les FrancoFolies de Montréal Spectrum Montreal
 2005 Le Cabaret Music-Hall à Montréal and touring En Solo mais pas Single
 2005 Le Grand Théâtre de Québec Quebec
 2006 L'Européen Paris
 2010 Les FrancoFolies de Montréal La Place des Arts Montreal
 2012 Les FrancoFolies de Montréal La grande scène Montreal
 2012 Tournée du ROSEQ Qué, N.B. /Canada
 2013 : Ne me quitte pas, Hommage à Jacques Brel - Festival de Tadoussac, FrancoFolies de Montréal CA
 2013 : Série de concerts en Europe et au Canada, en Solo, en Duo (avec Robbie McIntosh), avec Vincent Réhel et le Quatuor à Cordes Hermès
 2014 : Ne me quitte pas, Hommage à Jacques Brel - en Tournée au Québec CA
 2014 : Série de concerts en Europe et au Canada, en Solo, en Duo (avec Robbie McIntosh)
 2014 : Festival de Jazz de Montréal avec Vincent Réhel et les Mommies on the Run CA
 2015 : Ne me quitte pas, Hommage à Jacques Brel - En tournée au Québec et au Festival Montréal en Lumières (Salle Wilfried Pelletier de la Place des Arts) CA
 2016 : Printemps de Pérouges FR, en duo avec Robbie McIntosh
 2017 : Ne me quitte pas, Hommage à Jacques Brel - Avec l'Orchestre Symphonique de Montréal (Maison Symphonique de la Place des Arts) Montréal Qué. CA
 2017 : Le Baladin de Savièse CH, en duo avec Robbie McIntosh
 2017 : Pan Piper (Paris FR)
 2018 : Nuit du jazz, Chernex-sur-Montreux CH
 2021 - 2022 : 40 concerts tour in Canada - Bonsound and Tuta Music Tour.

Musicals
 1990: La légende de Jimmy, Théâtre Mogador, Paris by Michel Berger and Luc Plamondon.
 1991: Marilyn Montreuil (actrice and composer), Théâtre national de Chaillot, Paris by Jérôme Savary and Diane Tell
 2008: Je m'voyais déjà, Théâtre du Gymnase, Paris by Laurent Ruquier, songs by Charles Aznavour

References

External links 
 Diane Tell official website

Diane Tell at The Canadian Encyclopedia
Photo Collection at Flickr

1959 births
Canadian expatriates in France
Canadian singer-songwriters
Conservatoire de musique du Québec à Montréal alumni
French-language singers of Canada
French Quebecers
Living people
Musicians from Quebec City
20th-century Canadian women singers
21st-century Canadian women singers